In chemistry, a hydridonitride (nitridohydride, nitride hydride, or hydride nitride) is a chemical compound that contains hydride and nitride ions in a single phase. These inorganic compounds are distinct from inorganic amides and imides as the hydrogen does not share a bond with nitrogen, and contain a larger proportion of metals.

Structure
The hydride ion H− is stabilised by being surrounded by electropositive elements such as alkalis or alkaline earths. Quaternary compounds exist where nitrogen forms a complex with bonds to a transition or main group element. The hydride requires the presence of another alkaline earth element.

Production
Hydridonitrides may be produced by a process called self-propagating high-temperature synthesis (SHS) where a metal nitride is ignited in a hydrogen atmosphere.

A metal (Ti, Zr, Hf, Y) can also be ignited in an atmosphere mixing hydrogen and nitrogen, and a hydridonitride is formed exothermicly.

The molten metal flux technique involves dissolving metal nitrides and hydrides in an excess of molten alkaline earth metal, by heating till everything is molten, and then cooling until crystals form, but the metal is still liquid. Draining the liquid metal (and centrifuging) leaves the crystals of hydridonitride behind. A eutectic molten metal allows it to be cooled more.

If liquid alkali metal is used as a flux to grow a hydridonitride crystal, excess metal can be removed using liquid ammonia.

Properties
Some hydridonitride are sensitive to water vapour in air. For non-stoichimetric compounds, as the proportion of hydrogen increases, the unit cell dimensions also increase, so hydrogen is not merely filling holes. When heated to a sufficiently high temperature, hydridonitrides lose hydrogen first to form a metallic nitride or alloy.

Room temperature superconductor

One Lutetium hydride doped with nitrogen is claimed to be a room temperature superconductor at up to 21°C at a pressure of 1GPa, which is considerably lower than other polyhydrides. This has been called "red matter" as it is red under high pressure, but blue at ambient conditions.

List

References

Nitrides
Hydrides
Mixed anion compounds